Mount Carmel is an unincorporated community in Brown Township, Washington County, in the U.S. state of Indiana.

History
Mount Carmel was laid out in 1837.

Geography

References

Unincorporated communities in Washington County, Indiana
1837 establishments in Indiana
Unincorporated communities in Indiana
Populated places established in 1837